"Moravo, Moravo!" (Moravia, Moravia!) is a Czech patriotic song written by Václav Hanka, who claimed that it was an old Moravian folk song. Today it is sometimes used as an unofficial Moravian national anthem.

Czech anthems
Regional songs